Mihai Raicu was a Romanian fencer. He competed in the individual sabre event at the 1928 Summer Olympics.

References

External links
 

Year of birth missing
Possibly living people
Romanian male sabre fencers
Olympic fencers of Romania
Fencers at the 1928 Summer Olympics